The 2001 World Women's Curling Championship (branded as 2001 Ford World Women's Curling Championship for sponsorship reasons) was held March 31–April 8, 2001 at the Malley Sports Centre in Lausanne, Switzerland.

Teams

*First Appearance

Round-robin standings

Round-robin results

Draw 1

Draw 2

Draw 3

Draw 4

Draw 5

Draw 6

Draw 7

Draw 8

Draw 9

Playoffs

Brackets

Final

References
 

World Women's Curling Championship
Curling Championship
Curling Championship
Women's curling competitions in Switzerland
International sports competitions hosted by Switzerland
World Women's Curling Championship, 2001
World Women's Curling Championship
World Women's Curling Championship
World Women's Curling Championship, 2001